Ermilo Abreu Gómez (September 18, 1894 in Mérida, Yucatán – July 14, 1971 in Mexico City) was a writer, journalist and lecturer born in Mérida, Yucatán, México. He was a member of the Mexican Academy of Language from 1963. He was also a professor in several universities in the United States. He died in Mexico City in 1971.

Partial list of works
His literary work was varied, over a long period of time:

 La Xtabay. 1919
 El Corcovado. 1924
 Clásicos. Románticos. Modernos (1934)
 Canek. 1940
 in English: Canek. History and legend of a Maya hero.; transl. & introd. by Mario L. Dávila, Carter Wilson. University of California Press, Berkeley 1979 (cf. Google books)
 Héroes Mayas. Zamná. Cocom. Canek. 1942
 in German: Geschichten von den Maja-Indianern. transl. Ludwig Renn. Aufbau, Weimar 1948 
 Un Loro y tres Golondrinas (1946)
 Quetzalcóatl, sueño y vigilia (1947)
 Naufragio de indios (1951)
 La conjura de Xinúm (1958)
 Cuentos para contar al fuego (1959)
 Sor Juana Inés de la Cruz, bibliografía y biblioteca (1934)
 Diálogo del buen decir (1961)

The interest that Sor Juana Inés de la Cruz woke up in him became the passion of his life and it also led him to become her main critic. His most well-known work is Canek (1940), a story about the Maya revolutionary.

As a curiosity the commentary of the author on the book "Canek":
"And Nymph lost the best pages!". (Nymph was his wife who typed the original).

Sources
 Michel de Certeau, La escritura de la historia, México, Universidad Iberoamericana-Departamento de Historia, 1985.
 Miguel Gamboa Carrillo, Apuntes sobre la vida y obra de Ermilio Abreu Gómez, Mérida, Yucatán Escuela Normal Superior de Yucatán, 1981.
 Jorge Pech, La sabiduría de la emoción. Vida y literatura de Ermilo Abreu Gómez, México, Editorial Tierra Adentro-Conaculta, 1998.
 Guillermo Sheridan, Los Contemporáneos ayer, México, FCE, 1985

See also 
Mexican literature

Writers from Yucatán (state)
People from Mérida, Yucatán
Members of the Mexican Academy of Language
Mexican people of Catalan descent
1894 births
1971 deaths